Chelsea Valois (born October 11, 1987) is a Canadian bobsledder who has competed since 2012. She currently acts as the brakewoman for Jennifer Ciochetti and formerly Kaillie Humphries. Valois began as a track athlete at the University of Regina before switching to bobsleigh.

During the 2012–13 Bobsleigh World Cup she helped push Humphries to five straight wins. This success would continue as the pair placed first at the 2013 FIBT World Championships in St. Moritz.

Achievements

References

External links
 Bobsleigh Canada Profile PDF

1987 births
Living people
Canadian female bobsledders
Bobsledders at the 2014 Winter Olympics
Olympic bobsledders of Canada
Sportspeople from Saskatchewan
University of Regina alumni
21st-century Canadian women